Ruzaini bin Zainal (born 17 October 1988) is a Singaporean professional footballer who plays as an attacking midfielder.

He was born in Johor Bahru, Malaysia but grew up in Singapore. Ruzaini originally had a Malaysian citizenship but he later changed and received his Singapore citizenship while doing his national service with the Singapore Civil Defence Forces in February 2010, and has since played for the Singapore national team.

Club career

Early career
Ruzaini  who came through the youth system in SAFFC from 2004–2006, was in the Prime League team from 2007 to 2008 before doing National Service end 2008. And was back with the club end 2009.

Club career
Ruzaini played 17 times in the 2010 S.League scoring 1 goal against Albirex Niigata. His impressive performances caught the eye of the National Coach who drafted him into the Singapore national team for matches before the AFF Suzuki Cup. But was not pick for the tournament. He was awarded his first professional contract after he finished his national service in December 2010. In the 2013 S.League, Ruzaini sign for Tampines Rovers from SAFFC after having played 3 years with them. After the season, he was not retained by the club and went to sign for Tanjong Pagar United on 19 December 2013.

References

External links
 

1988 births
Living people
People from Johor Bahru
Association football midfielders
Singaporean footballers
Singapore international footballers
Warriors FC players
Young Lions FC players
Tampines Rovers FC players
Tanjong Pagar United FC players
Hougang United FC players
Singapore Premier League players
Expatriate footballers in Singapore
Malaysian emigrants to Singapore
People who lost Malaysian citizenship
Naturalised citizens of Singapore